Frank and Eliza Tryon House is a historic home located at Weedsport in Cayuga County, New York.  It was built in 1883, and is a two-story, Italianate style frame dwelling with a one-story rear section. It sits on a stone foundation built about 1870, and a shallow hipped roof with wide, overhanging eaves.  It features a one-story, shallow hipped roof wrapround porch.  Also on the property is a contributing two-story clapboard barn with a front gable roof and a concrete foundation (c. 1920).

It was listed on the National Register of Historic Places in 2014.

References

Houses on the National Register of Historic Places in New York (state)
Italianate architecture in New York (state)
Houses completed in 1887
Buildings and structures in Cayuga County, New York
National Register of Historic Places in Cayuga County, New York